The 2004 European Short Track Speed Skating Championships took place between 16 and 18 January 2004 in Zoetermeer, Netherlands.

Medal summary

Medal table

Men's events

Women's events

Participating nations

See also
Short track speed skating
European Short Track Speed Skating Championships

External links
Detailed results
Results overview

European Short Track Speed Skating Championships
European Short Track Speed Skating Championships
European
International speed skating competitions hosted by the Netherlands
Sport in Zoetermeer
European Short Track Speed Skating Championships